A caramel tart is a sweet tart, filled with a soft piped caramel filling found in New South Wales and Queensland in Australia, although noticeably absent in other areas. They are sometimes also topped with cream or drizzled with chocolate.

See also
 List of pies, tarts and flans

References

Australian desserts
Tarts